Thomas Michael Reilly III (born June 18, 1959, in Fort Riley North, Kansas) is an American actor, known for his role as Officer Bobby "Hot Dog" Nelson in CHiPs, a television series about the motorcycle officers of the California Highway Patrol.

Prior to his acting career, he was a star football player at Montclair State College (now Montclair State University) in Upper Montclair, New Jersey but eventually dropped out.

On June 18, 1982, he went into NBC studios for a screen test. His first role on CHiPs was Officer Rick Nichols in the May 23, 1982, episode "Force Seven," a rejected pilot for a new series. After the departure of Larry Wilcox, Tom returned in the role of Officer Bobby Nelson, the new partner of Ponch (Erik Estrada). His role of Officer Bobby Nelson was featured somewhat less prominently in the final episodes, with Officer Bruce Nelson (Bruce Penhall), his younger brother, eventually becoming Ponch's partner in the episode "Fast Company." CHiPs was eventually cancelled by the spring of 1983. Bobby Nelson did not return in the reunion film, CHiPs '99.

He stopped acting in 1997. In 2005, he worked at the Orco Construction Supply in Salinas, California. He lives in the Monterey Peninsula with his wife and two children.

Appearances
Tom made appearances on the following shows:

CHiPs (1982/1983).... Officer Rick Nichols/Officer Bobby 'Hot Dog' Nelson
$25,000 Pyramid (December 5–9, 1982) (TV)
Young Warriors (1983) .... Scott 
Slaughterhouse Rock (1988) .... Richard Gardner
Terminal Exposure (1988) .... Maxwell 
Kiss and Be Killed (1991) .... Phil 
Married... with Children (Just Shoe It) (1992) TV episode .... Caterer
Animal Instincts (1992) .... Ken 
Mirror Images II (1994) (TV) .... Jake
Sworn to Vengeance (1993) (TV) 
Animal Instincts 2 (1994) .... Man with Loose Tie 
Valley of the Dolls (1994) .... Peter D'Allesio
Caged Hearts (1995) .... Foreman #1 
Ice Cream Man (1995) .... Charley 
Deep Cover (1996) .... Jim
Shades of Gray (1997) .... Frank

References

External links

1959 births
Living people
Montclair State University alumni
People from Bergenfield, New Jersey
Male actors from Kansas
American male television actors
American male film actors